Lawnton is a suburb in the Moreton Bay Region, Queensland, Australia.

Geography
Lawnton is bounded on the north and north-east by the North Pine River, to the south-east by the South Pine River  and Four Mile Creek.

Brisbane–Woodford Road, concurrent with Gympie Road, passes through the centre of the suburb in a south-north direction.

The Caboolture railway line (North Coast railway line) enters the suburb from the north (Petrie) and exits to the south (Strathpine) with the suburb served by Lawnton railway station.

History

The origin of the suburb name is from an early property owner, the blacksmith Stephen Lawn. The property was acquired by Queensland Rail and was named Lawnton.

On Saturday 25 August 1888, Lady Musgrave, wife of the Queensland Governor Anthony Musgrave laid the foundation stone for St Thomas’ Anglican church at North Pine (as the area was previously known). It was located on the corner of Station Road and Todds Road on land donated by Stephen Lawn and built by James Todd. The church was dedicated on St Thomas's Day 21 December 1888 by Reverend C.G. Robinson, Rural Dean of Brisbane. The pulpit from the Samsonvale Homestead was donated to the church by William Joyner. The church was last used in 1984. Its altar rails were re-conditioned for re-use in the new St Faith's Anglican Church in Strathpine, while the altar and other furnishings from St Thomas's were used to create a St Thomas' Chapel within the new church. The old church was relocated to the Old Petrie Town open-air museum.

Lawnton State School opened in 1967.

Pine Rivers Special School opened in April 1986.

The area east of Gympie Road was previously known as Wyllie (named after Alexander James Wyllie) until September 1989 when the Queensland Government decided to incorporate it within the suburb of Lawnton. It was also the location of the World War II Petrie Airfield.

The median age of the Lawnton population was 36 years, 1 year below the national median of 37. 78.3% of people living in Lawnton were born in Australia. The other top responses for country of birth were New Zealand 5.1%, England 4%, Philippines 1%, India 0.9%, South Africa 0.6%. 90.7% of people spoke only English at home; the next most common languages were 0.8% Hindi, 0.5% Tagalog, 0.3% Dutch, 0.3% Italian, 0.3% Spanish.

Economy
The Lawnton industrial estate as well as retail and commerce establishments along Gympie Road provide local services and employment. Alluvial gravel and sand mining also occur in Lawnton. There have been recent industrial and retail developments in Lawnton.

Education 
Lawnton State School is a government primary (Prep-6) school for boys and girls at Todds Road. In 2018, the school had an enrolment of 553 students with 40 teachers (33 full-time equivalent) and 27 non-teaching staff (17 full-time equivalent). It includes a special education program.

Pine Rivers Special School is a special primary and secondary (Early Childhood-12) school for boys and girls at 10 Lawnton Pocket Road. In 2018, the school had an enrolment of 201 students with 58 teachers (49 full-time equivalent) and 62 non-teaching staff (41 full-time equivalent).

YOS Lawnton is a private secondary (10-12) school for boys and girls at 27-29 Lawnton Pocket Road. In 2018, the school had an enrolment of 50 students with 5 teachers and 11 non-teaching staff (8 full-time equivalent). This school is a Youth Outreach Service by the Salvation Army which aims to get students who have disengaged with schooling to re-engage.

There is no mainstream secondary school in Lawnton. The nearest government secondary schools are Pine Rivers State High School in neighbouring Strathpine to the south and Bray Park State High School in neighbouring Bray Park to the south-west.

Amenities 

The Moreton Bay Regional Council operates a mobile library service which visits Barclay Park on Nightingale Drive.
Leis Park has electric barbecues and a boat ramp into the North Pine River. Wyllie Park on the Lawnton / Petrie border also has electric barbecues.

Lawnton Cemetery (also known as Mary Bray Park) is located on Norfolk Avenue.

Transport
Lawnton railway station provides access to regular Queensland Rail City network services to Brisbane, Cleveland, Ipswich, Beenleigh and Springfield Central, as well as Kippa-Ring.

References

External links

 

Suburbs of Moreton Bay Region